Gold Hill Township is one of ten townships in Gallatin County, Illinois, USA.  As of the 2010 census, its population was 1,708 and it contained 811 housing units.

Geography

Cities, towns, villages
 Junction
 Shawneetown

Cemeteries
The township contains these seven cemeteries: Kanady, McGehee, New & Old Bradley Family, Fields, Byrd, and Westwood.

Major highways
  Illinois Route 13

Demographics

School districts
 Gallatin Community Unit School District 7

Political districts
 Illinois's 19th congressional district
 State House District 118
 State Senate District 59

References
Bibliography
 
 United States Census Bureau 2007 TIGER/Line Shapefiles
 United States National Atlas
Citations

External links
 City-Data.com
 Illinois State Archives

Townships in Gallatin County, Illinois
Townships in Illinois